Riyadh Mohammed Mohammed Husami Sharahili (born 28 April 1993) is a Saudi professional footballer who plays for Al-Shabab as a midfielder.

Career
Sharahili began his career at the youth teams of Al-Nassr. On 5 July 2015, Sharahili joined Al-Fateh on a three-year contract following his release from Al-Nassr. On 10 July 2018, Sharahili joined First Division side Al-Tai. On 3 March 2019, Sharahili joined Al-Faisaly. On 12 July 2019, Sharahili joined newly promoted Pro League side Al-Adalah. On 9 September 2020, Sharahili joined Abha on a two-year contract. On 16 July 2021, Sharahili renewed his contract with Abha until 2024. On 28 January 2023, Sharahili joined Al-Shabab on a four-year contract.

Career statistics

Club

References

External links
 

Living people
Saudi Arabian footballers
Saudi Arabia international footballers
Sportspeople from Riyadh
1993 births
Al Nassr FC players
Al-Fateh SC players
Al-Tai FC players
Al-Faisaly FC players
Al-Adalah FC players
Abha Club players
Al-Shabab FC (Riyadh) players
Association football midfielders
Saudi Professional League players
Saudi First Division League players
2022 FIFA World Cup players